Costa del Azahar ("Orange Blossom Coast") or Costa dels Tarongers ("Orange Tree Coast") is the name for the coast of the province of Castellón in Spain, from Vinaròs to Almenara.

Towns on the Costa del Azahar include Peñíscola, Benicarló, Oropesa del Mar, Benicàssim and Castellón de la Plana.

References

 

Azahar
Landforms of the Valencian Community